Manus Lunny (born 1962) is an Irish producer and multi-instrumentalist from County Donegal, Ireland, best known as a member of Celtic supergroup Capercaillie. He is the brother of multi-instrumentalist and producer Dónal Lunny.

Biography and career
Manus Lunny was born in Dublin and reared in Newbridge, Co. Kildare in a family which practised music regularly. He has been living in Co. Donegal for many years now, close to where his mother was born in Ranafast. He toured widely with Barry Moore (now Luka Bloom) as a teenager. He was a member of Scottish/Irish band The Wild Geese which toured Ireland and performed limited concerts in Britain. After the band took a break, Lunny began to tour with Phil Cunningham and future long-term collaborator Andy M. Stewart. They toured as a trio to begin with before branching out into other bands.

Manus is best known as a member of Celtic supergroup Capercaillie. He has composed music for the BBC and various American television broadcasters and was a prominent session musician on two of Ireland's most well known compilations, Éist and Ceol Tacsi.vision recordings.

In collaboration with Phil Cunningham, Lunny has written two pieces for the American record label Windham Hill.

Lunny's work also includes the album Imeall, Altan's lead singer and fiddler Mairéad Ní Mhaonaigh's debut solo album and Na Mooneys, the eponymous debut album by Mairéad Ní Mhaonaigh's family band called Na Mooneys.

After decades of gigging and recording, Lunny finally gotten around to making a CD of his own compositions titled The Glenveagh Suite. Actually, he received a commission from the National Parks and Wildlife Services to compose music for five short films about Glenveagh National Park, its history and its conservation initiatives in County Donegal. For the album, Lunny got some of his most favourite musicians to play and sing on it: Moya Brennan, Mairéad Ní Mhaonaigh, Neil Martin, Martin Crossin, Theresa Kavanagh, Donald Shaw, Ewen Vernal, Liam Bradley, Mary Crossin and Caitlin Nic Gabhann. Lunny had a gathering on 29 September 2018 (9pm) in Leo's Tavern in Meenaleck to mark the launch and also to play music for the occasion.

Partial discography

Solo
 2018 - The Glenveagh Suite

Lunny, Stewart, Cunningham
 1990 – At It Again, Manus Lunny & Andy M. Stewart
 1990 – Songs of Robert Burns, Andy M. Stewart (also produced)
 1987 – Dublin Lady, Manus Lunny & Andy M. Stewart
 1986 – Fire in the Glen, Manus Lunny, Phil Cunningham & Andy M. Stewart (also co-produced)

With Capercaillie
See Capercaillie (since 1989)

With Na Mooneys 
"Soilse na Nollag" (4:26) (single released on 17 December 2017) by Na Mooneys and Manus Lunny (a Christmas Song or Carol, composed by Francie Mooney and Mairéad Ní Mhaonaigh (his daughter), made available to help raise funds for the St. Vincent de Paul Society who help people who are disadvantaged all year round, and whose help is especially needed by people at Christmas)

Other collaborations
 2009 – T with the Maggies, T with the Maggies (musician and produced)
 2009 – Ceol Cheann Dubhrann, Various (also produced, mixed, recorded and engineered)
 2008 – Imeall, Mairéad Ní Mhaonaigh (also co-produced)
 2006 – Loinneog Cheoil, Aoife (also produced and mixed)
 2006 – Wired, Michael McGoldrick
 2006 – Raining Up, Mairéad Nesbitt (also produced and mixed)
 2006 – Draíocht, Dave Flynn (engineered and played bodhrán)
 2005 – Earthsongs, Secret Garden
 2004 – The Very Best of Celtic Christmas, Various artists
 2003 – Celtic Twilight, Various artists
 2003 – Celtic Compass, Various artists
 2002 – At First Light, Michael McGoldrick & John McSherry
 2001 – 25 Years of Celtic Music, Various artists
 2001 – Journey: The Best Of, Dónal Lunny
 2000 – A Thistle & Shamrock Christmas Ceilidh, Various artists
 2000 – Song of the Green Linnet, Various artists
 2000 – Fused, Michael McGoldrick
 2000 – Celtic Woman Vol. 2, Various artists
 2000 – Idir : Identités, Various artists
 2000 – Gaelic Voices, Various artists
 1999 – The Voice of Celtic Music, Various artists
 1999 – Scotland Forever, Various artists
 1999 – Myriad, Gerry O'Connor
 1999 – For Love of Erin, Various artists
 1999 – Legends of Scottish Fiddle, Various artists
 1999 – Celtic Christmas, Various artists
 1999 – Bretagnes a Bercy, Various artists
 1998 – Joyful Noise: Celtic Favorites from Green Linnet, Various artists (also produced and arranged)
 1998 – Celtic Reflections, Various artists
 1998 – Celtic Christmas Vol. 4, Various artists
 1998 – The Celts Rise Again, Celtophile (also produced)
 1998 – Playing With Fire, Various artists
 1998 – Her Infinite Variety: Celtic Women in Music & Song, Various artists
 1997 – Celtic Love Songs, Celtophile (also produced)
 1997 – Traditional Music of Scotland, Celtophile (also arranged and produced)
 1997 – Celtic Music Today, Celtophile (also produced)
 1997 – Scottish Voices, Various artists
 1997 – There Was a Lady: The Voice of Celtic Women, Various artists
 1997 – If Ever I Return, Connie Dover
 1997 – The Dreaming Sea, Karen Matheson
 1996 – Celtic Christmas, Vol. 2, Various artists
 1996 – Green Linnet 20th Anniversary Collection, Various artists
 1996 – Windham Hill Sampler '96, various artists
 1995 – Celtic Christmas (Windham Hill), various artists
 1995 – Celtic Graces: A Best of Ireland, various artists
 1995 – Celtic Voices: Women of Song, various artists
 1994 – The Best of Ireland, various artists
 1994 – Wishing Well, Connie Dover
 1992 – Heart of the Gaels, various artists (also produced)
 1991 – Time to Time, Gerry O'Connor
 1990 – Somebody, Connie Dover
 1990 – The Celts Rise Again, Karen Matheson
 1987 – Dónal Lunny, Dónal Lunny

See also
 Dónal Lunny
 Mairéad Ní Mhaonaigh

References

External links
 Capercaillie

1962 births
Living people
Irish male singer-songwriters
Irish male guitarists
Irish bouzouki players
Irish folk singers
Musicians from County Kildare
Musicians from County Donegal
People from Gweedore
Capercaillie (band) members
Green Linnet Records artists